Triumph of Love (German: Ich lebe für Dich) is a 1929 German silent drama film directed by William Dieterle and starring Dieterle, Lien Deyers and Olaf Fønss. It was made by the German branch of Universal Pictures and shot at the Tempelhof Studios in Berlin and on location in Arosa in Switzerland and the Spree Forest in Brandenburg. The film's art direction was by Alfred Junge and Max Knaake.

Cast
 William Dieterle as Bergson  
 Lien Deyers as Nicoline  
 Olaf Fønss as Fürst Wronsky  
 Erna Morena as Fürstin Wronsky  
 Hubert von Meyerinck as Flemming

References

Bibliography
 Hans-Michael Bock and Tim Bergfelder. The Concise Cinegraph: An Encyclopedia of German Cinema. Berghahn Books.

External links

1929 films
Films of the Weimar Republic
Films directed by William Dieterle
German silent feature films
German black-and-white films
Universal Pictures films
Films shot at Tempelhof Studios
Films shot in Switzerland
1929 drama films
German drama films